The shiny-blue sculptured miner bee (Andrena cleodora) is a species of miner bee in the family Andrenidae. It is found in North America.

Subspecies
These two subspecies belong to the species Andrena cleodora:
 Andrena cleodora cleodora (Viereck, 1904)
 Andrena cleodora melanodora Cockerell, 1932

References

Further reading

 
 

cleodora
Articles created by Qbugbot
Insects described in 1904